Cegléd is a district in south-eastern part of Pest County. Cegléd is also the name of the town where the district seat is found. The district is located in the Central Hungary Statistical Region.

Geography 
Cegléd District borders with Nagykáta District to the north, Szolnok District (Jász-Nagykun-Szolnok County) to the east, Tiszakécske District (Bács-Kiskun County) and Nagykőrös District to the south, Kecskemét District (Bács-Kiskun County) to the southwest, Dabas District to the west, Monor District to the northwest. The number of the inhabited places in Cegléd District is 12.

Municipalities 
The district has 3 towns and 9 villages.
(ordered by population, as of 1 January 2013)

The bolded municipalities are cities.

Demographics

In 2011, it had a population of 88,952 and the population density was 100/km².

Ethnicity
Besides the Hungarian majority, the main minorities are the Roma (approx. 1,800), German (950) and Romanian (300).

Total population (2011 census): 88,952
Ethnic groups (2011 census): Identified themselves: 79,369 persons:
Hungarians: 75,431 (95.04%)
Gypsies: 1,837 (2.31%)
Germans: 966 (1.22%)
Others and indefinable: 1,135 (1.43%)
Approx. 9,500 persons in Cegléd District did not declare their ethnic group at the 2011 census.

Religion
Religious adherence in the county according to 2011 census:

Catholic – 32,171 (Roman Catholic – 31,892; Greek Catholic – 268);
Reformed – 10,632;
Evangelical – 3,987;
other religions – 1,257; 
Non-religious – 14,304; 
Atheism – 781;
Undeclared – 25,820.

Gallery

See also
List of cities and towns in Hungary

References

External links
 Postal codes of the Cegléd District

Districts in Pest County